The Three Rivers Festival is an annual multi-day event held in Fort Wayne, Indiana. The festival spans nine days in mid-July, starting on the first Friday after Independence Day. It is a celebration of the heritage of Fort Wayne, established during the French and Indian War at the confluence of three rivers - the Maumee, St. Marys, and St. Joseph. Events include concerts, a community parade, amusement rides, a bed race, art and craft shows, children's and seniors mini-fests, an International Village, and a fireworks finale.

History
At the first Three Rivers Festival in 1969, an estimated 100,000 people attended a grand parade and 60 events on the Columbia Street Landing. The festival in 1973 attracted one million visitors. Among its highlights was the air show by the Navy's Blue Angels. In 1976, the festival included an international beer can collectors convention. That year, attendance topped 2 million. In 1977, the festival added fireworks for the first time, and its opening day parade was the second largest in the state. When the festival opened in 1979, seven hundred balloons were released from the top of a city building. By 1980, the festival had grown to 206 events across the city.

In 1991, a $20,000 Arts United grant expanded Sunday in the Park to art events at Seniors Day and the Children's Festival. By 1999, the Art in the Park was expanded to include Main Street, featuring a juried show of 85 national artists. That same year, the Three Rivers Festival enjoyed crowds in excess of 500,000, maintaining its position as the second largest event in Indiana.

In 2021, the festival held its inaugural drag show. The two-hour event featured Fort Wayne local, Della Licious.

Financial background 
Three Rivers Festival is a 501(c)4 not-for-profit organization, founded in 1969, and funded entirely by vendor participation fees, souvenir sales, refreshment sales, entertainment ticket sales, and the sponsorship and support of area businesses.

For 2009 and 2010, Fort Wayne Newspapers was the Festival Title sponsor. National Serv-all was the 2010 sponsor of the Fireworks Finale. PNC, Sweetwater and STAR 88.3 were other major 2010 sponsors.

Three Rivers Festival events
The Three Rivers Festival holds multiple events, centered in Headwaters Park in downtown Fort Wayne, Indiana.

Art In The Park
The first weekend of the festival features "Art in the Park", a juried fine arts show and sale, located on Freimann Square, Main Street and Barr Street. Over 100 artists from northeast Indiana and across the country sell oils, watercolors, photography, sculpture, pottery, and more.

Opening Day Parade
Beginning in the West Central neighborhood, the two-hour parade winds through downtown Fort Wayne. A local musical group typically opens the parade with the national anthem, followed by many parade units, area high school marching bands, local celebrities, and approximately 100 other entries.

Fireworks Finale
The finale of the festival is a fireworks show, noted as one of Northeast Indiana's largest pyrotechnic show.

References

Festivals in Indiana
Culture of Fort Wayne, Indiana
Economy of Fort Wayne, Indiana
Tourist attractions in Fort Wayne, Indiana